The Garfield Building is a thirteen-story Art Deco style historic structure in Los Angeles, California. Designed by American architect Claud Beelman, construction lasted from 1928 to 1930. It is listed on the National Register of Historic Places.

Architecture and history

In addition to the detailed ornamentation around the street-level entry way, the Garfield Building has an art deco lobby. It was a working office building for many years, but it's empty now. The building has  of rentable space for filming or other events. Located just off of South Hill Street at 403 West 8th Street, it is in the downtown Jewelry District, which in recent years, has had a revival, with lofts, artist's work spaces, and new shops, restaurants, and businesses around the Garfield.

The main entrance is marked by an elaborate wrought iron entrance canopy above and a terrazzo sidewalk below. Floral and grapevine patterns decorate the open grillwork above the entrance. The lobby is graced with polished nickel fittings, elegant display cases, and Gothic-style chandeliers in tones of gold and silver. The walls and floors of the lobby are clad in alternating bands of black and purple marble, and the twenty-foot lobby ceiling has a low bas relief pattern in plaster.

The building was sold in 1991 and since then has been vacant. The Los Angeles Downtown News named the building one of the "Ten Worst Eyesores" of downtown Los Angeles.

It has been declared as Los Angeles Historic-Cultural Monument No. 121.

References

Skyscraper office buildings in Los Angeles
Buildings and structures in Downtown Los Angeles
Los Angeles Historic-Cultural Monuments
Commercial buildings on the National Register of Historic Places in Los Angeles
Office buildings completed in 1930
1930 establishments in California
1930s architecture in the United States
Art Deco architecture in California